In physics, Lami's theorem is an equation relating the magnitudes of three coplanar, concurrent and  non-collinear vectors, which keeps an object in static equilibrium, with the angles directly opposite to the corresponding vectors. According to the theorem,

where A, B and C are the magnitudes of the three coplanar, concurrent and non-collinear vectors, which keep the object in static equilibrium, and α, β and γ are the angles directly opposite to the vectors.

Lami's theorem is applied in static analysis of mechanical and structural systems.  The theorem is named after Bernard Lamy.

Proof 

As the vectors must balance , hence by making all the vectors touch its tip and tail we can get a triangle with sides A,B,C and angles . By the law of sines then

Then by applying that for any angle ,  we obtain

See also
 Mechanical equilibrium
 Parallelogram of force
 Tutte embedding

References

Further reading
 R.K. Bansal (2005). "A Textbook of Engineering Mechanics". Laxmi Publications. p. 4. .
 I.S. Gujral (2008). "Engineering Mechanics". Firewall Media. p. 10. 

Statics
Physics theorems